Paula Wilcox (born 13 December 1949) is an English actress. With a career spanning over 50 years, she is best known for her role as Chrissy in the popular ITV sitcom Man About The House from 1973 to 1976. She has also had roles in TV shows such as The Lovers, Miss Jones and Son, The Queen’s Nose, The Smoking Room, Emmerdale, Mount Pleasant, Boomers, Upstart Crow and Girlfriends. Since 2020, Wilcox has appeared as Elaine Jones in Coronation Street.

Early life
Wilcox was born in Manchester in 1949 to Joseph and Mary Wilcox.

Career
Wilcox first came to public attention whilst a member of the National Youth Theatre, which she joined aged seventeen. She was offered her first starring television role in The Lovers, a Granada sitcom produced for the ITV network, largely written by Jack Rosenthal and co-starring Richard Beckinsale. There were two series of The Lovers, plus a feature film. She appeared in an episode of The Benny Hill Show (Thames) broadcast on 23 February 1972.

Wilcox was cast in one of the lead roles of Man About the House (Thames, 1973–1976) as Chrissy Plummer, who was regularly in a flirtatious battle of wits with her male flatmate Robin, played by Richard O'Sullivan. The series ran for six series and the main cast also featured in the spin-off feature film. Her follow-up role was as the eponymous single mother in Miss Jones and Son (1977–1978).

In 1991, Wilcox returned to situation comedy as Ros West in a Yorkshire Television sitcom called Fiddlers Three opposite Peter Davison before playing the character of Ivy Sandford in the pilot of Frank Skinner's Blue Heaven on Channel 4 in 1992, the show then went on to become a series. She appeared in several series of The Queen's Nose (1995–2001), and also played small roles in the films The Higher Mortals (1993) and the Woody Allen movie Scoop (2006).

She was cast as Lilian in the BBC Three sitcom The Smoking Room which ran from 2004–2005.

On 27 October 2006, Wilcox appeared in the Only Fools and Horses spin-off The Green Green Grass as Marlene's sister. She has also played another character in the Only Fools and Horses universe, appearing in 2 episodes of Rock and Chips, playing Edward "Grandad" Trotter's estranged wife Violet. In 2007, Wilcox joined the cast of Emmerdale as Hilary Potts, mother of the vicar's wife, Laurel Thomas (Charlotte Bellamy).

In 2008, Wilcox portrayed Bette Davis in a theatrical play, Whatever Happened to the Cotton Dress Girl?. In 2010, she portrayed a mother of a gay son in a theatrical play, Canary.

In November 2010, Wilcox took the leading role as a Liverpudlian private eye in Following from the Front, a BBC radio play first broadcast in November 2010 and again in January 2015 

Wilcox played Pauline Johnson in the Sky1 sitcom series Mount Pleasant from 2011 to 2017.

In addition to her other work, Wilcox has made guest appearances in programmes such as Footballers' Wives, Holby City and Down to Earth.

In 2014, she had a starring role in the comedy series Boomers and the following year she had a role in an episode of Still Open All Hours.

In 2017, Wilcox filmed series 3 of Upstart Crow - the Shakespearean sitcom starring David Mitchell and penned by Ben Elton.

Also in 2017 Wilcox filmed the last episode of the Sky 1 series Mount Pleasant after 7 years of playing Pauline Johnson.

Wilcox's theatre credits include Chris Hannan's play What Shadows about Enoch Powell's famous "Rivers of Blood" speech on immigration. This was performed at the Birmingham Rep, Edinburgh Lyceum and the Park Theatre, London in 2016 and 2017.

Other theatrical work includes: Great Expectations (Vaudeville Theatre); Canary (Liverpool Everyman / Hampstead Theatre); Dreams of Violence (Soho Theatre) and La Cage aux Folles (Playhouse Theatre).

Wilcox has also performed radio and voiceover work and most recently read the audiobook Three Things About Elsie written by Joanna Cannon.

Wilcox has appeared in Coronation Street since 2020, playing the role of Elaine Jones, a former abuse victim and first wife of Geoff Metcalfe (Ian Bartholomew) and mother of established character Tim Metcalfe (Joe Duttine). She previously appeared in Coronation Street in 1969 as Ray Langton's sister Janice.

Personal life
Wilcox was married to fellow actor Derek Seaton from 1969 until his death in 1979 from a brain haemorrhage aged 35.

In 1991 Wilcox married Nelson "Skip" Riddle, an American businessman and the eldest son of the composer, bandleader and arranger Nelson Smock Riddle.

Filmography

Film

Television

References

External links

1949 births
Living people
English television actresses
English soap opera actresses
English stage actresses
20th-century English actresses
21st-century English actresses
Audiobook narrators
Actresses from Manchester
National Youth Theatre members